McGregor is a city in McLennan and Coryell counties in the U.S. state of Texas. The population was 5,338 at the 2020census.

McGregor lies in two counties, as well as two metropolitan areas. The McLennan County portion of the city is part of the Waco Metropolitan Statistical Area, while the small portion that lies in Coryell County is part of the Killeen–Temple–Fort Hood Metropolitan Statistical Area.

Geography

McGregor is located in western McLennan County at  (31.431928, –97.417022). It extends westward into Coryell County, surrounding McGregor Industrial Park, a former Naval Weapons Reserve Plant.

U.S. Route 84 passes through the city center, leading northeast  to Waco and west  to Gatesville. Texas State Highway 317 crosses US 84 near the city center, leading north  to Valley Mills and south  to Belton.

Demographics

2020 census

As of the 2020 United States census, there were 5,321 people, 1,714 households, and 1,118 families residing in the city.

2000 census
As of the census of 2000, 4,727 people, 1,728 households, and 1,206 families resided in the city. The population density was 216.7 people per square mile (83.6/km). There were 1,856 housing units at an average density of 85.1/sq mi (32.8/km). The racial makeup of the city was 71.10% White, 11.53% African American, 1.02% Native American, 0.38% Asian, 14.41% from other races, and 1.57% from two or more races. Hispanics or Latinos of any race were 27.27% of the population.

Of the 1,728 households, 33.1% had children under the age of 18 living with them, 51.4% were married couples living together, 13.4% had a female householder with no husband present, and 30.2% were not families. About 27.7% of all households were made up of individuals, and 15.2% had someone living alone who was 65 years of age or older. The average household size was 2.63 and the average family size was 3.21.

In the city, the population was distributed as 27.7% under the age of 18, 9.1% from 18 to 24, 25.4% from 25 to 44, 18.6% from 45 to 64, and 19.3% who were 65 years of age or older. The median age was 36 years. For every 100 females, there were 85.6 males. For every 100 females age 18 and over, there were 81.1 males.

The median income for a household in the city was $33,200, and for a family was $37,143. Males had a median income of $31,250 versus $18,605 for females. The per capita income for the city was $16,311. About 10.9% of families and 14.9% of the population were below the poverty line, including 19.1% of those under age 18 and 16.3% of those age 65 or over.

Economy
McGregor is the site of the former Bluebonnet Ordnance Plant to make munitions during World War II. After the war, the site has been used by a number of companies to make rockets, including Phillips Petroleum Company, Rocketdyne, Hercules Inc. and Beal Aerospace.
SpaceX has a rocket engine development and test facility in McGregor. SpaceX acquired the facility from defunct Beal Aerospace that had established it as a rocket engine test facility. In May 2016, McGregor passed an ordinance to reduce noise and vibration caused by SpaceX testing activity.

McGregor is the home of Magnolia House, a Victorian property renovated in Season 3 of HGTV's Fixer Upper by Chip and Joanna Gaines.  It now operates as a bed and breakfast.

Education
The city is served by the McGregor Independent School District and the Midway Independent School District

Transportation
 McGregor station (Texas)

Climate
The climate in this area is characterized by hot, humid summers and generally mild to cool winters.  According to the Köppen Climate Classification system, McGregor has a humid subtropical climate, abbreviated "Cfa" on climate maps.

References

External links
 City of McGregor official website

Cities in McLennan County, Texas
Cities in Texas
Cities in Coryell County, Texas
Killeen–Temple–Fort Hood metropolitan area